Rae White is a Brisbane-based poet and writer. White is non-binary and the founding editor of the online periodical #EnbyLife: Journal for non-binary and gender diverse creatives. White's 2017 poetry collection Milk Teeth won the Thomas Shapcott Poetry Prize, was commended in the 2018 Anne Elder Award, and was shortlisted for the 2019 Victorian Premier's Literary Awards. Their poetry and writing has been published in the Australian Poetry Journal, Capricious, Cordite, Meanjin, Overland, and Rabbit.

White's poems have been described as "challeng[ing] notions of category, identity, form and gender" and having an "ability to incorporate new techniques without alienating the reader". They are also involved in poetry judging panels, including the 2019 and 2020 Anne Elder Award. They have a Bachelor of Fine Arts in Creative Writing Production from QUT.

Published works 
 Exactly As I Am published by UQP (2022)
 'Abundantly blue in Australian poetry journal (2021)
 'wanna cyber??? ;))''' in Antithesis Journal (2021)
 Milk Teeth published by UQP (2018)
 'Glitter and Leaf Litter' in Capricious (2018)
 'apollo polination in Meanjin Quarterly (2017)

 Awards and nominations 
 Shortlist in the Woollahra Digital Literary Award for Standup (2022) Published in Backslash Lit
 Digital Innovation Shortlist in the Woollahra Digital Literary Award for How to Haunt (2021)
 Highest Queensland Entry in the Queensland Poetry Festival Awards for The last tourist (2020)
 Shortlist in the Woollahra Digital Literary Award for who, what, why, where (2020)
 Highest Queensland Entry in the XYZ Prize for Innovation in Spoken Word for Hussshhh (2019)
 Second Place in the Rachel Funari Prize for Fiction for The Body Remembers (2019)
 Second Place in the Overland Judith Wright Poetry Prize for what even r u? (2017)
 Winner in the Thomas Shapcott Poetry Prize for Milk Teeth (2017)

 Prize judging and editor 
 Anne Elder Award (Judge in 2019 and 2020)
 #EnbyLife'' (Editor)

References

External links 
 #EnbyLife Journal
 Rae White on University of Queensland Press website
 Official website
 GoodReads Author page

1985 births
Living people
Writers from Brisbane
Australian poets
Non-binary writers